Oxalosuccinic acid is a substrate of the citric acid cycle. It is acted upon by isocitrate dehydrogenase.  Salts and esters of oxalosuccinic acid are known as oxalosuccinates.

Oxalosuccinic acid/oxalosuccinate is an unstable 6-carbon intermediate in the tricarboxylic acid cycle. It's a keto acid, formed during the oxidative decarboxylation of isocitrate to alpha-ketoglutarate, which is catalyzed by the enzyme isocitrate dehydrogenase. Isocitrate is first oxidized by coenzyme NAD+ to form oxalosuccinic acid/oxalosuccinate. Oxalosuccinic acid is both an alpha-keto and a beta-keto acid (an unstable compound) and it is the beta-ketoic property that allows the loss of carbon dioxide in the enzymatic reaction in conversion to the five-carbon molecule 2-oxoglutarate.

References

Tricarboxylic acids
Alpha-keto acids
Beta-keto acids